Fragasso may refer to:

Persons 
 Claudio Fragasso (born 1951), a director and screenwriter from Italy
 Michel Fragasso (1888–1954), an engineer from Italy who immigrated to Quebec, Canada

Toponyms 
 Fragasso Lake, a body of water in Jacques-Cartier National Park, Quebec, Canada